A roundabout dog is a form of street installation that began in Sweden during the autumn of 2006 and continued for the rest of the year. There have been sporadic subsequent recurrences. The phenomenon consists of anonymous people placing homemade dog sculptures, typically made of wood (or sometimes plastic, metal or textile) in roundabouts. Occurrences were reported all over Sweden, and the phenomenon also spread to other countries, including Spain after it was mentioned on television. A Swedish tabloid paper placed one at Piccadilly Circus.

History

The roundabout dogs started appearing in Linköping, Östergötland, Sweden after a sculptured dog that was part of the official roundabout installation Cirkulation II by sculptor Stina Opitz had been vandalised and later removed. The original dog had been made of concrete, and Opitz was planning to make a new version of it after the vandalism, when someone placed a homemade wooden dog  on the roundabout. The dog was given a concrete dogbone by another anonymous artist. Soon after the media reported these developments, roundabout dogs started appearing in various places around the country.

In some smaller towns where there were no roundabouts, dog sculptures were placed in ordinary intersections with traffic islands.

In July 2007, artist Lars Vilks incited controversy by creating drawings for an art exhibition, which depicted Muhammed as a roundabout dog. The publication of these images in Swedish newspapers led to Vilks being subjected to threats of violence and put under police protection until his death in October 2021.

In 2009, similar dogs appeared on some of the roundabouts in Hemel Hempstead, Hertfordshire.

References

External links
News article from The Local 
Building Roundabout dog website 
27 October 2006, Expressen 

2006 in Sweden
2006 sculptures
Sculptures of dogs
Outdoor sculptures in Sweden
Graffiti and unauthorised signage
Swedish art
Östergötland
Public art
Outdoor sculptures in England
Memes
2000s fads and trends